Daud Kamal (4 January 1935 - 5 December 1987) (Urdu: داؤد کمال)) was a Pakistani poet who wrote most of his work in the English language.

His poetry was influenced by modernist English-language poets like Ezra Pound, W.B. Yeats and T.S. Eliot.

Education and career
Born in Abbottabad in 1935, the son of Chaudhry Mohammad Ali, who served as the vice-chancellor of the University of Peshawar, and was the founder of the Jinnah College for Women in 1964, he received his early education from the Burn Hall Abbottabad there followed by Burn Hall Srinagar, before going to the Islamia College Peshawar. Then, he completed his Bachelor of Arts degree from the University of Peshawar and the Tripos from the University of Cambridge in England.

For 29 years, he also had served as a teacher and chairman of University of Peshawar's Department of English.

Books
 Remote Beginnings
 Compass of love and other poems
 Recognitions
 Before the Carnations Wither

Professor Daud Kamal also translated from Urdu into English some selected poems of Faiz Ahmed Faiz and Mirza Ghalib.

Awards and recognition
It has been said that during the 1970s he won "three gold medals in three international poetry competitions sponsored by the Triton College, U.S.A."

He received the Faiz Ahmed Faiz award in 1987 and a posthumous Pride of Performance award in 1990 from the President of Pakistan.

Death
Professor Daud Kamal died in the United States on 5 December 1987. Later he was buried in the cemetery of the same university where he taught for 29 years, University of Peshawar's graveyard in front of the Pashto Academy.

References

1935 births
1987 deaths
Pakistani poets
Pakistani translators
English-language poets from Pakistan
Recipients of the Pride of Performance
University of Peshawar alumni
Academic staff of the University of Peshawar
Alumni of the University of Cambridge
20th-century translators
Army Burn Hall College alumni
People from Abbottabad